Pattankudi is a village in the southern state of Karnataka, India. It is located in the Chikodi taluk of Belgaum district in Karnataka.

Demographics
 India census, Pattankudi had a population of 7493 with 3801 males and 3692 females.

Shri Mahalaxmi Temple

See also 
 Belgaum
 Districts of Karnataka

References

External links
 http://Belgaum.nic.in/

Villages in Belagavi district